The women's 48 kg competition at the 2016 European Judo Championships was held on 21 April at the TatNeft Arena.

Results

Finals

Repechage

Pool A

Pool B

Pool C

Pool D

References

External links
 

W48
European Judo Championships Women's Extra Lightweight
European W48